Tokovitsa is a rural locality (a village) in Zavrazhskoye Rural Settlement, Nikolsky District, Vologda Oblast, Russia. The population was 23 as of 2002.

Geography 
Tokovitsa is located 34 km southeast of Nikolsk (the district's administrative centre) by road. Zavrazhye is the nearest rural locality.

References 

Rural localities in Nikolsky District, Vologda Oblast